The Ashes is a Test cricket series played between England and Australia. The series have varied in length, consisting of between one and seven Test matches, but since 1998 have been consistently five matches. It is one of sport's most celebrated rivalries and dates back to 1882. It is generally played biennially, alternating between the United Kingdom and Australia. Australia are the current holders of the Ashes, having won the 2021-22 series.

Although the first Test series played between England and Australia was in the 1876–77 season, the Ashes originated from the solitary Test which the two nations contested in 1882. England lost the match, played at The Oval, and a mock obituary was posted in The Sporting Times, declaring the death of English cricket. It stated that: "The body will be cremated and the ashes taken to Australia." The Honourable Ivo Bligh adopted the term and, as captain of the English party that travelled to Australia the following winter, promised to bring the "Ashes" home.

After its loss to Australia in 1882, England won the next eight series between the two sides, during which time it lost only four of the 22 Tests. Australia won an Ashes series for the first time in 1891–92, when it beat England 2–1. The 1932–33 tour  was known as the "Bodyline series" as, in response to the talented Australian batsman Don Bradman, England developed a tactic of bowling quickly at the body of the batsmen with most of the fielders placed in a close ring on the leg side. England won the series, but the tactic prompted changes to the laws of cricket, and the Australians, buoyed by the batting of Bradman, regained the Ashes during the next series and then held them for six series, spanning nineteen years. It was during this period that the Australians travelled to England in 1948, and remained unbeaten during the whole tour, gaining the nickname of "The Invincibles". In addition to winning the five match Test series 4–0, Australia won or drew all of its 29 other matches against county and representative sides.

Australia has won more Ashes Tests than England, winning 140 of the 340 matches, compared to England's 108 victories. Australia also holds the edge in Ashes series won, having won on 34 occasions compared to England's 32. There have been six drawn series, and on five of these occasions, Australia has retained the Ashes due to being holders going into the series. England has retained the Ashes after a drawn series once. On only three occasions has a team won all the Tests in an Ashes series; Australia has achieved the feat 5–0 in 1920–21, 2006–07 and 2013–14. England's largest winning margin in an Ashes series was in 1978–79, when it won 5–1. England's largest unbeaten winning margin of 3–0 in an Ashes series was achieved in 1886, 1977 and 2013. Both England and Australia have held the Ashes for a record eight consecutive series, England doing so between 1882–83 and 1890, while Australia achieved the feat from 1989 to 2002–03. 

Since 1882, only one series has been played between the two sides that was not deemed an Ashes series, that being the 3 Test Cricket series in the Australian summer of 1979–80, won by Australia 3-0. This was the first Australian home Test series with a unified team after two summers of World Series Cricket and was not deemed an ashes series as England had retained the Ashes 5-1 on Australian soil 12 months earlier. On three other occasions, a one-off commemorative Test Match was played in which the Ashes were not at stake, which were the 1977 Melbourne Centenary Test, the 1980 Lords Centenary Test and the 1988 Bicentennial Test played at the SCG in January 1988.

Key
 Years denotes the cricket season in which the series takes place.
 Host denotes the host country for the series.
 First match denotes the date on which the first match of the series commenced.
 Tests denotes how many Tests were played in the series, and in parentheses (if different) the number of Tests that were scheduled to be played in the series.
 Australia denotes how many matches in the series were won by Australia.
 England denotes how many matches in the series were won by England.
 Drawn denotes how many matches in the series were drawn.
 Result denotes which side won the series overall, or if it was drawn.
 Holder denotes which side was awarded (or retained) the Ashes at the end of the series  of the  matches

List of Ashes series

Summary of results

Notes and references
Notes

References

External links

Australian cricket lists
English cricket lists
The Ashes
Lists of sports events in Australia